John Barrett or Johnny Barrett may refer to:

Clergy 
 John Barrett (bishop) (1878–1946), British clergyman who held high office in the Roman Catholic Church
 John Barrett (dean of Clonmacnoise) (1929–1996), Irish Anglican priest
 John Barrett (Hebrew scholar) (1753–1821), Irish Anglican priest
 John C. A. Barrett (born 1943), Chairman of the World Methodist Council and educator

Military personnel 
 John Barrett (Irish soldier) (died 1693), Irish colonel in the Williamite war
 John Barrett (Royal Navy officer) (died 1810), Irish captain in the Royal Navy
 John Cridlan Barrett (1897–1977), English recipient of the Victoria Cross

Politicians 
 John Barrett (Australian politician) (1858–1928), Australian senator
 John Barrett (Massachusetts politician) (born 1947), American legislator and former mayor of North Adams
 John Barrett (Missouri politician) (1915–2000), American legislator
 John Barrett (Scottish politician) (born 1954), Scottish Liberal Democrat politician and the former Member of Parliament for Edinburgh West

Scholars 
 John Barrett (energy researcher), British energy and climate change scientist
 John Barrett (Hebrew scholar) (1753–1821), Irish Anglican priest
 John C. Barrett (born 1949), British archaeologist
 John W. Barrett (mathematician), British mathematician
 John W. Barrett (physicist), British mathematical physicist

Sportpeople 
 John Barrett (American football) (1899–1966), American football player
 John Barrett (athlete) (born 1879), Irish track and field athlete
 John Barrett (Australian footballer) (born 1928), Australian rules footballer
 John Barrett (cricketer) (born 1946), English cricketer
 John Barrett (ice hockey) (born 1958), Canadian NHL defenceman
 John Barrett (outfielder) ( 1872), American baseball outfielder
 John Barrett (tennis) (born 1931), English tennis player and commentator
 John Barrett (volleyball) (born 1962), Canadian volleyball player
 Johnny Barrett (American football) (1895–1974), American football player
 Johnny Barrett (baseball) (1915–1974), American baseball player

Others 
 John Barrett (actor) (1910–1983), British actor
 John Barrett (conservationist) (1913–1999), British conservationist, author and broadcaster
 John Barrett (diplomat) (1866–1938), United States ambassador to Siam, Argentina, Panama, and Colombia
 John Barrett (salon), the brand of beauty and hair salons by hairstylist John Barrett
 John Barrett, frontman of the band Bass Drum of Death
 John F. Barrett (born 1949), CEO of Western & Southern Financial Group

See also
 Jack Barrett (disambiguation)
 John Barret (disambiguation)
 John Barrett Kerfoot (1816–1881), American bishop